3-hydroxy-9,10-secoandrosta-1,3,5(10)-triene-9,17-dione monooxygenase (HsaA) is an enzyme with systematic name . This enzyme catalyses the following chemical reaction:

 3-hydroxy-9,10-secoandrosta-1,3,5(10)-triene-9,17-dione + FMNH2 + O2  3,4-dihydroxy-9,10-secoandrosta-1,3,5(10)-triene-9,17-dione + FMN + H2O

This bacterial enzyme participates in the degradation of several steroids, including cholesterol and testosterone.

References

External links 
 

EC 1.14.14